This is a list of television programs currently and formerly broadcast by Yes TV, a regional religious-based television system in the Canadian provinces of Ontario and Alberta that also carries mainstream programming during primetime and afternoon hours.

Current programming
(As of September 2016)

Original programming
 100 Huntley Street
 The Doc Side
 Let's Talk (aired on CKCS and CKES only)
 RocKids TV
 Young Once

Entertainment programming
 A Day in a Life
 Chicago Hope 
 Touched By An Angel 
 Highway To Heaven 
 Little Mosque On The Prairie
 The Beverly Hillbillies
 The Choir
 Dr. Quinn, Medicine Woman
 Everybody Loves Raymond
 Family Ties
 Green Force
 Harry
 Hot Bench
 Jeopardy!
 Judge Judy
 Making House
 Marriage Under Construction
 The King of Queens
 Wheel of Fortune
 The X Factor

Sports
 Canadian Basketball League games (beginning October 2016)

Late night
 Buzzr After Hours

Former programming

Original programming
 Always Good News with Connie Smith
 Behind the Story
 Eye To Eye
 Faith Journal
 Full Circle
 Inside World Report
 Israel Today
 It's Your Call
 Listen Up!
 Messages
 Michael Coren Live (call-in show)
 The Michael Coren Show
 Most Requested
 Municipal Insight
 On the Front Line
 On the Line
 Passages
 Real Life
 Rhonda London
 Rise & Shine
 TQ (children's show)
 Uncommon Ground
 The Warehouse (program for teens)

Entertainment programming
 7th Heaven (2000-2003, 2008-2009, 2010-2011)
 The Adventures of Ozzie and Harriet (2012-2014)
 ALF (2011-2014)
 Alice (1998-2004)
 Amen (1998-1999, 2008-2009)
 American Idol
 America's Funniest Home Videos
 The Andy Griffith Show (2000-2002, 2011-2014)
 The Brady Bunch (2000-2001, 2010-2011)
 Charles in Charge (2003-2004)
 Christy (2004-2005)
 Coach (2004-2006)
 The Cosby Show (1999-2000, 2010-2012)
 The Courtship of Eddie's Father (2000-2001)
 Danger Bay (2004-2005)
 Diff'rent Strokes(2005-2008)
 Dr. Quinn, Medicine Woman (1998-2000, 2003-2005, 2009-2010)
 Eight Is Enough (2002-2003)
 The Facts of Life (2006-2009)
 Family Affair (2001-2002)
 Family Matters (2008-2010)
 Family Feud
 Father Dowling Mysteries (2010)
 The Flying Nun (2001-2003)
 The Fresh Prince of Bel-Air (2006-2009, 2010-2011, 2012-2014)
 Full House (2004-2007, 2008-2009, 2010-2014, 2014-2015)
 Frasier (2018-2019)
 The Gilmore Girls (2015-2018)
 Gilligan's Island (2010-2012)
 Growing Pains (2000-2002)
 Happy Days (1998-2009, 2010-2011)
 Highway to Heaven (1998-1999)
 The Hogan Family (2000-2002, 2008-2009, 2010-2011)
 The Hughleys (2004-2005)
The Jim Henson Hour (2003-2005)
 Kids Say the Darndest Things (2003-2004)
 Laverne & Shirley (2007-2009, 2010-2011)
 Leave It to Beaver (2001-2002)
 Life Goes On (2001-2002, 2010, 2011)
 Little House on the Prairie (1998-2004, 2009-2010, 2011-)
 The Lucy Show (2001-2002)
 Mad About You (2010-2011)
 Major Dad (2003-2004)
 Moesha (2002-2003)
 Mr. Belvedere (2002-2003, 2004)
 The Muppet Show (2003-2005)
 My Three Sons (1999-2000)
 The Nanny (2010)
 The Partridge Family (2010-2011)
 Promised Land (2000-2001, 2009-2010)
 Step by Step (2006-2008)
 Touched by an Angel (2003-2005)
 The Waltons (1998-1999, 2010-2014)
 Webster (2002-2003)
 The Wonder Years (2002-2003, 2005, 2010-2011, 2019-2020)
 Yes, Dear (2004-2006)

References

See also 
List of Canadian television series

Yes TV